Seir al-Ebad elal-Ma'ad (meaning: the journey of the servants in return to origin) is a poetry book of Sanai in form of Masnavi which moral issues are discussed. Its release date back to year 1131 AD (525 AH). In this book, Sanai discusses the creation of man and psyches and wisdoms through allegory. The Masnavi of Seir al-Ebad elal-Ma'ad was composed in same rhythm of Hadiqat ul-Haqiqah and is about 800 verses long.

Sanai composed Seir al-Ebad elal-Ma'ad in Sarakhs, Razavi Khorasan Province, Iran and finished it with the praise of someone called Abu al-Mafakher Saif al-Din Muhammad ibn Mansour, the judge of Sarakhs.

Seir al-Ebad elal-Ma'ad is in fact an allusion to the journey of the mystic in the authorities of annihilation. During it, the poet narrates the story of the passage of the soul, guiding by intellect through the levels and curtains of a Neoplatonism world. Similar to this work in European literature is Dante's Divine Comedy. In pre-Islamic literature, the text of Book of Arda Viraf depicts a enduring theme of spiritual journey to the other world.

In the three transformations of Sanai's life, Seir al-Ebad elal-Ma'ad is at the stage where Hakim Sanai is transferred from the pure poetic period of his youth to the Sufism period. This work was amendmented and re-published by Mohammad Taghi Modarres Razavi under the name "Masnavis of Sanai" in 1969 with association of University of Tehran Press.

Synopsis
Seir al-Ebad elal-Ma'ad is a Masnavi form poet book that can be studied without interruption, without divisions and chapters. This work basically has an introduction and three major sections: Introduction in the description of wind; The first section is about life or organ world or appearance of light in life in darkness of the material world; The second section is the journey in world of elements or soul and the third section is the stage of consciousness or Reason. In general, this orderly poet book is only a story in terms of storyline and other sub-stories have not interrupted it.

Seir al-Ebad elal-Ma'ad, in the beginning has no acknowledgment and gratitude and such introductions. The narration begins with the descent of the human soul from the upper world to the lower world and explains the stages of the soul and the animal soul and their results. The seeker finds himself trapped in the clutches of impure tempers. On the one hand, the rational soul calls him up, and on the other hand, tempers pulls him to the ground. Unaware and confused, he seeks guidance until he is finally confronted with a "gentle and spiritual old man". The old man introduces himself as a messenger of the whole intellect who has descended to save him. They start the journey together and the old man sits on the seeker's shoulder. Then the travel steps are followed.

Sample poem
Some verses from this book translated to english as follows:

...

...

See also
 Hadiqat al Haqiqa
 Karnameye Balkh
 Tariq ut-tahqiq

References

External links
 SANĀʾI on iranicaonline
 Sanai's books on Goodreads
 Hakim Sanai Poems

Sanai works
Ethics books